The 2016–17 season was the 110th in the history of Venezia F.C. and their first season back in the third division. The club participated in Lega Pro and Coppa Italia Lega Pro, winning both.

Squad 

 (on loan from Salernitana)

 (on loan from Virtus Entella)

Pre-season and friendlies

Competitions

Overall record

Lega Pro

League table

Results summary

Results by round

Matches 
The league fixtures were announced on 11 August 2016.

Supercoppa Lega

Coppa Italia Lega Pro

References 

Venezia F.C. seasons
Venezia